Francine Noël (born 1945 in Montreal, Quebec) is a Canadian writer, whose 2005 work La Femme de ma vie won the 2006 edition of Première Chaîne's Le Combat des livres.

She teaches theatre at the Université du Québec à Montréal.

Awards and nominations
She was a nominee for the Governor General's Award for French language fiction in the 1983 Governor General's Awards for Maryse, and in the 1987 Governor General's Awards for Myriam première. She was a nominee for the Governor General's Award for French language drama in the 1985 Governor General's Awards for Chandeleur.

Works
 Maryse (1983)
 Chandeleur: Cantate parlée pour cinq voix et un mort (1985)
 Myriam première (1987)
 Nous avons tous découvert l'Amérique (1992)
 La Conjuration des bâtards (1999)
 La Femme de ma vie (2005)
 J'ai l'angoisse légère (2008)
 L'usage de mes jours (Leméac, 2020)

References

1945 births
21st-century Canadian novelists
Canadian women dramatists and playwrights
Canadian women novelists
Writers from Montreal
Living people
20th-century Canadian dramatists and playwrights
21st-century Canadian dramatists and playwrights
20th-century Canadian women writers
21st-century Canadian women writers
Canadian novelists in French
Canadian dramatists and playwrights in French